The Ireland national rugby union team is the men's representative national team for the island of Ireland in rugby union. The team represents both the Republic of Ireland and Northern Ireland. Ireland competes in the annual Six Nations Championship and in the Rugby World Cup. Ireland is one of the four unions that make up the British & Irish Lions – players eligible to play for Ireland are also eligible for the Lions.

The Ireland national team dates to 1875, when it played its first international match against England. Ireland reached number 1 in the World Rugby Rankings for the first time in 2019. Eleven former Ireland players have been inducted into the World Rugby Hall of Fame.

History

Early years: 1875–1900

Dublin University was the first organised rugby football club in Ireland, having been founded in 1854. The club was organised by students who had learnt the game while at public schools in Great Britain. During the third quarter of the nineteenth century, and following the adoption of a set of official rules in 1868, rugby football began to spread quickly throughout Ireland, resulting in the formation of several other clubs that are still in existence, including NIFC (1868); Wanderers (1869); Queen's University (1869); Lansdowne (1873); Dungannon (1873); Co. Carlow (1873); UCC (1874); and Ballinasloe (1875) which amalgamated with Athlone to form Buccaneers.

In December 1874, the Irish Football Union was formed. Initially, there were two unions: the Irish Football Union, which had jurisdiction over clubs in Leinster, Munster and parts of Ulster and the Northern Football Union of Ireland which formed in January 1875 and controlled the Belfast area. The IRFU was formed in 1879 as an amalgamation of these two organisations, convening for the first time on 5 February 1880.

Ireland lost their first test match against England 0–7 at the Oval on 15 February 1875. Both teams fielded 20 players in this match, as was customary in the early years of rugby union; it was not until 1877 that the number of players was reduced from 20 to 15. That same year Ireland's first home match, also against England, was held at Leinster Cricket Club's Observatory Lane ground in Rathmines, as Lansdowne Road was deemed unsuitable. The first match at Lansdowne Road was held on 11 March 1878, with England beating Ireland by two goals and a try to nil.

Following a six-year period of defeats, in 1881 Ireland finally achieved their first test victory, beating Scotland at Ormeau in Belfast, following a late drop goal from John C Bagot. Ireland turned up two men short for their test in Cardiff in 1884 and had to borrow two Welsh players. Ireland's first test match victory at Lansdowne Road on 5 February 1887, was also their first win over England, with the final score of two goals to nil. On the third of March 1888, Ireland recorded their first win over Wales with a goal, a try and a drop goal to nil.

In 1894, Ireland followed the Welsh model of using seven backs instead of six for the first time. After victory over England at Blackheath, Ireland won back-to-back matches for the first time when recording their first win over Scotland on 24 February 1894. Ireland went on to beat Wales in Belfast and win the Triple Crown for the first time.

In the 1890s, Rugby was primarily a game for the Protestant middle class; the only Catholic in Edmund Forrest's 1894 team was Thomas Crean. Of the eighteen players used in the three games, thirteen were from three Dublin clubs – Wanderers, Dublin University and Bective Rangers – and the remaining five were from Ulster. They went on to win the Home international championship twice more before the century was out (1896 and 1899), so that by 1901 all four of the Home Unions had tasted success at a game that was growing in popularity with players and spectators.

Early 20th century: 1901–45

Such was the level of interest in the visit of the first New Zealand team to Dublin in November 1905 that the IRFU made the match the first all-ticket rugby international in history. Ireland played only seven forwards, copying the then New Zealand method of playing a "rover". The game ended New Zealand 15 Ireland 0.

On 20 March 1909, Ireland played France for the first time, beating them 19–8. This was Ireland's biggest victory in international rugby at that time, their highest points tally and a record five tries. 30 November 1912 was the first time the Springboks met Ireland at Lansdowne Road, the 1906 tour game having been played at Ravenhill. Ireland with seven new caps were overwhelmed by a record margin of 38–0, still a record loss to South Africa who scored 10 tries. In 1926, Ireland went into their final Five Nations match unbeaten and with the Grand Slam at stake lost to Wales in Swansea. Ireland again came close to a grand slam in 1927 when their sole loss was an 8–6 defeat by England.

Post-war: 1945–70
In 1948, Ireland clinched their first Grand Slam in the Five Nations. Ireland were champions and Triple Crown winners again in 1949. In 1951, Ireland were once more crowned Five Nations champions.
1952 saw only Ireland's second overseas tour, the first for over half a century – as they headed to Argentina for a nine-match trip. The tour included two test matches, their Test record being won one, drawn one. In total, out of the nine matches played, the Irish side was only defeated once by Club Pucará.

On 27 February 1954, Ireland played Scotland at Ravenhill in Belfast. The 11 Republic-based players protested "God Save the Queen", and an abbreviated anthem known as "the Salute" was instead played. Ireland beat Scotland 6–0, and did not play in Northern Ireland again until 2007.

In 1958, Ireland beat Australia 9–6 in Dublin, the first time a major touring team had been defeated.

In the 1958–59 season Ireland came second in the Five Nations beating both Scotland and France who had already won the series.

Ireland managed just three victories in the Five Nations Championship during the early 1960s: against England in 1961, Wales in 1963 and England again in 1964. 1965 saw an improvement as Ireland beat England and Scotland.

On 10 April 1965 at Lansdowne Road Ireland recorded their first ever win over South Africa. In January 1967 Ireland again beat Australia in Dublin, 15–8. Ireland became the first of the home nations to win in the Southern Hemisphere and the first of the Five Nations sides to win in Australia, when they beat Australia 5–11, in Sydney in May 1967. On 26 October 1968, Ireland made it four successive wins over the Wallabies.
In 1969, Ireland claimed a 17–9 victory over France in the Five Nations, a first victory over Les Bleus in 11 years. In the autumn of 1969, the Irish Rugby Football Union appointed a coach for the national team for the first time, the role went to Ronnie Dawson.

Later 20th century: 1970–94

The 1972 Five Nations Championship was not completed when Scotland and Wales refused to play in Ireland following threatening letters to players, purportedly from the IRA. The championship remained unresolved with Wales and Ireland unbeaten. In 1973, despite similar threats, England fulfilled their fixture and were given a five-minute standing ovation. Ireland won 18–9. Ireland came close to a first win over the All Blacks on 20 January 1973, but drew 10–10. In 1974, Ireland won their first Five Nations Championship since 1951.

The decision to play two tests in apartheid-era South Africa in May 1981 led to boycotts of Irish athletes in other codes, and was not supported by the Irish government. Several prominent players refused to participate in the tour, while others were refused leave by their employers for the tour.

Willie John McBride was coach until 1984. In 1982, Ireland, led by out-half Ollie Campbell, won the Five Nations and their first Triple Crown in 33 years. Three years later in 1985, Ireland won the Five Nations and the Triple Crown again. It was Ireland's last silverware until 2004.
Ireland scored 10 tries against Romania in a 60–0 win on 1 November 1986, the biggest win by a Tier One country in international rugby at the time.
At the inaugural 1987 Rugby World Cup, victories over Tonga and Canada saw Ireland through to the quarter-finals, where they were beaten 33–15 by joint hosts Australia.

Ireland failed to win the Five Nations in the whole of the 1990s, never finishing outside the bottom two. In 1991, they lost their test series against Namibia.
At the second Rugby World Cup in 1991, after wins over Japan and Zimbabwe, Ireland lost 15–24 at Murrayfield. Ireland played the Wallabies at Lansdowne Road in the quarter-finals and appeared to be on the verge of a shock victory over Australia, when Michael Lynagh scored the winning try to clinch a 19–18 win for Australia.
At the 1994 Five Nations Championship, Ireland beat England at Twickenham.

Professional era and new stadium: 1995–2010

At the 1995 World Cup, Ireland came through their group to make their third consecutive quarter-final appearance. France proved too strong, with Ireland going down 12–36 in the quarter-finals.

The start of the professional era was disappointing for Ireland, who finished bottom of the Five Nations Championship three years in succession (1996, 1997 and 1998) and lost to Italy three times, at home (29–37) and abroad (12–22 and 22–37). Warren Gatland took over as coach in 1998, but was unable to produce immediate success. The 1999 World Cup was staged primarily in Wales, though Ireland played all their pool games in Dublin. In a play-off, Ireland were beaten 28–24 by Argentina, marking the first time that Ireland failed to reach the quarter-finals.

From this nadir, however, Irish rugby improved. The Irish Rugby Football Union converted the four representative provincial sides into de facto club sides, and the formation in 2001 of the Celtic League (now called the Pro14) provided Irish provincial sides with regular competitive rugby.

The advent of the new Six Nations format coincided with this Irish resurgence. In 2001, Ireland finished second. Eddie O'Sullivan took over as coach in November 2001 after Warren Gatland was sacked.
The 2003 Six Nations Championship saw Ireland lose to England in the Grand Slam decider at Lansdowne Road, ending a home unbeaten run that stretched to 10 tests since September 2002. 

In the 2004 Six Nations, Ireland finished second overall and won the Triple Crown. In the 2005 Six Nations, Ireland finished in third place.

In the 2006 Six Nations, Ireland won the Triple Crown for the second time in three years. In the last autumn international at Lansdowne Road, Ireland beat Australia 21–6.

With the rebuilding of Lansdowne Road, a new venue was required. Croke Park, home of the Gaelic Athletic Association, hosted some games from 2007 to 2010. Ireland's 2008 Six Nations campaign included three losses. Eddie O'Sullivan resigned as Ireland coach and Declan Kidney was appointed. 

Ireland won the 2009 Six Nations Championship and Grand Slam, their first Six Nations win since 1985 and their first Grand Slam since 1948. After a draw against Australia and victories against Fiji and South Africa, Ireland ended 2009 unbeaten.

In Ireland's final game of the 2010 Six Nations, and the last-ever game at Croke Park, Ireland lost to Scotland 20–23 and failed to win the Triple Crown. Ireland began their 2010 Autumn Tests with a 21–23 loss to South Africa, the first international at the new Aviva Stadium.

2011 to present
In the 2011 Six Nations Championship, Ireland lost 22–25 to France in the first Six Nations match to be played at the Aviva Stadium. During a 13–19 loss against Wales, Ireland's Ronan O'Gara became the first Irishman, and only the fifth player, to score 1,000 points. In Ireland's 24–8 win against England, Brian O'Driscoll scored his 25th try to set a new Six Nations record for tries scored.

In their 2012 Six Nations Championship campaign Ireland finished third overall. Ireland's 2012 summer tour of New Zealand included a 22–19 loss, followed by a 60–0 thrashing, Ireland's heaviest ever defeat.

The 2013 Six Nations Championship saw Ireland finish with one win, three losses, and one draw, including their first home loss to England in 10 years; and their first ever loss to Italy in the Six Nations. The IRFU declined to extend Declan Kidney's contract, and Joe Schmidt was announced as the new Ireland coach.
In their 2013 end-of-year rugby union tests, Ireland lost 22–24 to New Zealand, having led throughout the match.

Ireland opened their 2014 Six Nations Championship with wins over Scotland and Wales. Ireland lost 10–13 to England. Ireland won their next match against Italy 46–7. Ireland beat France 22–20 in the final round to claim the Six Nations title. In November they defeated South Africa 29–15 and Australia 26–23 at Dublin.

Ireland retained the 2015 Six Nations Championship, and became Six Nations Champions for the second year running on points difference. Following wins against Wales and Scotland during warm-up matches for the 2015 Rugby World Cup, Ireland briefly reached its highest-ever position of second in the World Rugby rankings. Ireland won its pool at the 2015 Rugby World Cup with a 24–9 victory over France, but lost in the quarter-finals to Argentina 20–43.

Entering the 2016 Six Nations competition with a squad depleted by injury, Ireland won only two matches in the tournament (58–15 against Italy in Round 4, and 35–25 against Scotland in Round 5), and only achieved a 16–16 draw against Wales. The team went on to win the first of their three-match tour of South Africa 26–20, before losing the second and third tests 26–32 and 13–19. In autumn of the same year, Ireland defeated the New Zealand All Blacks for the first time ever on 5 November 2016 in Chicago by 40–29. This was New Zealand's only loss all year, and ended their record-breaking win streak of 18 test matches. Despite New Zealand winning the return fixture in Dublin the following week 21–9, Ireland moved up to fourth in the world rankings.

Ireland placed second in the 2017 Six Nations Championship, behind defending champions England, who the Irish defeated in the final of round of the competition by 13–9, ending England's record-equalling run of 18 victories since 2015. However, they lost to Scotland 22–27 in Round 1 and Wales 9–22 in Round 4 during the same tournament. With many first-choice players selected to tour with the British & Irish Lions, Ireland took a development squad into their summer games that year, which included a 55–19 win over the USA, and a 2–0 test series victory against Japan. In November 2017, Ireland moved to third in the world rankings following their biggest-ever win over South Africa, 38–3, and victories over Fiji and Argentina.

After winning the 2018 Six Nations Championship with a Grand Slam, Ireland moved up to second in the world rankings. A 2–1 series win over Australia in summer that year was followed by a second victory in two years against the world number one All Blacks, by 16–9 which cemented Ireland's number two ranking and most accumulated rating points (91.17) in their history. Following their success in the Six Nations, the Australia tour and the autumn internationals, Ireland were named 2018 World Rugby Team of the Year with Joe Schmidt claiming World Rugby Coach of the Year.

The 2019 Six Nations started with a defeat to England, by 20–32. After this, they beat Scotland, Italy and France, but the competition concluded with a loss against Grand Slam winners Wales which ended 7–25. The Welsh led the Irish by 25–0 going into overtime, until a last-gasp try from replacement half-back Jordan Larmour. However, Ireland achieved some redress when they defeated Wales back-to-back, home and away, in the 2019 Rugby World Cup warm-up matches and subsequently reached number 1 in the World Rugby Rankings for the first time in their history, which they retained going in to the 2019 Rugby World Cup.

The 2019 Rugby World Cup ended in disappointment for the Irish, who opened their campaign with a rousing 27–3 win over Scotland, but were felled the following round in a shock 12–19 defeat to tournament hosts Japan. Ireland overcame their other pool opponents Russia (35–0) and Samoa (47–5) to reach the quarter-finals, but were knocked out by New Zealand 46–14. The loss to the All Blacks represented Ireland's seventh exit at the quarter-finals of a World Cup, having never reached a semi-final, and saw their place in the world rankings fall from 1st going into the tournament to 5th by its conclusion.

2020 saw Ireland´s first Six Nations campaign under former defense coach Andy Farrell, who replaced Joe Schmidt after the World Cup, interrupted by the COVID-19 pandemic. Prior to the disruption, Ireland notched wins against Scotland (19–12) and Wales (24–14) before losing against England 12–24. Ireland´s fourth round game against Italy was delayed until October that year, with the Irish recording a 50–17 win, going on to a 27–35 defeat against France to finish the truncated tournament in 3rd place. In the subsequent Autumn Nations Cup, Ireland again defeated Wales (32–9) and Scotland (31–16) but were beaten once again by England, 7–18. Their performance in the game against Georgia, although a comfortable win on the scoreboard (23–10) was criticized for a perceived lack of spirit or tactical ingenuity. Ireland finished 2020 with their ranking unchanged, at 5th in the world.

The 2021 Six Nations took place again amidst the ongoing pandemic, with spectators still excluded. In this changed environment Ireland would have an indifferent campaign, once again finishing 3rd with wins over Italy (48–10), Scotland (27–24) and England (32–18), after losing their opening two matches to France (13–15) and eventual champions Wales (16–21). Ireland played most of the game against Wales down to 14 men after veteran flanker Peter O'Mahony became the first Irish player to be red carded in a Six Nations match, for a foul on Wynn Jones in the 14th minute. Ireland achieved two victories in the 2021 July tests against Japan (39–31) and the United States (71–10). Ireland finished the season with an 8–2 record, following a clean sweep in the Autumn Nations series, defeating Japan (60–5), New Zealand (29–20) and Argentina (53–7).

Ireland opened their 2022 Six Nations campaign with an emphatic 29–7 victory over Wales, only to lose to France 30–24 the next week at the Stade De France. They then defeated an ill-disciplined Italy in Dublin 57–6 and got their biggest win over England at Twickenham since 1964 (15–32). On the final day of the tournament, Ireland had to win against Scotland and France had to lose against England in order for Ireland to win the Championship. Ireland won the Triple Crown on the final day of the tournament, beating Scotland 26–5 in Dublin, but failed to win the Championship after France beat England 25–13 in Saint-Denis.

After losing the opening test match of the 2022 New Zealand tour, Ireland scored their first victory against the All Blacks on New Zealand soil on 9 July 2022, their fourth win over New Zealand. Three days later, they followed up their historic win with their first victory over the Maori All Blacks in four attempts, beating the side 24–30 in Wellington. On 16 July 2022 Ireland became just the fifth touring side and first in the professional era to achieve a series win in New Zealand, beating the All Blacks 22–32 in Wellington for a 2–1 series victory. Following that victory Ireland officially became the world number one team for the second time in their history.

On 18 March 2023, Ireland won the Grand Slam for the fourth time in a 29–16 victory over England in Dublin.

Playing strip

Ireland's traditional strip consists of a green jersey, white shorts, and green socks. Their emblem consists of a shamrock and a rugby ball; a shamrock has been incorporated into the emblem since the side first played in 1874.

Between 1996 and the summer of 2002, Ireland's main shirt sponsor was Irish Permanent who became Permanent TSB after a merger, who continued to sponsor the shirt until the autumn of 2006. O2 were Ireland's main shirt sponsor from then until 2014. Three Ireland were the team sponsors up until the summer of 2016 where Vodafone then became the main sponsor.

Before 1992, Umbro supplied kit to Ireland. Nike were the suppliers between 1992 and the summer of 2000. Canterbury of New Zealand took over after the summer of 2000 and was the supplier until June 2009. In November 2009, Puma took on the supply of Ireland's playing and training kit. In January 2014, the IRFU signed a deal with Canterbury for the supply of Ireland's playing and training kit from November 2014 until 2020, which was then extended to 2024.

Flags and anthems

The Irish rugby union team is one of many sporting teams that draws its players from both the Republic of Ireland and Northern Ireland, part of the United Kingdom. This has led to issues surrounding the flags and national anthems.

When Ireland international matches were played alternately in Belfast and Dublin, the British national anthem "God Save the Queen" was played before matches in Belfast and the national anthem of Ireland "Amhrán na bhFiann" was played for matches in Dublin. The British anthem is no longer played. No anthem was played at away games. In the 1987 Rugby World Cup, "The Rose of Tralee" was used as the anthem against Wales, although in the other matches no anthem was played.

Since April 1995, a specially-composed anthem, "Ireland's Call", has been used by the Ireland team at away games. This has prompted some players and supporter complaints that "Amhrán na bhFiann" should also be played. At games played in Dublin, "Ireland's Call" is always played alongside "Amhrán na bhFiann". With Ireland's test match against Italy in the run up to the 2007 Rugby World scheduled to be held in Belfast (the first match played there since 1953), there were calls for "God Save the Queen" to be used alongside "Ireland's Call" but this was turned down by the IRFU with the explanation given that both "Ireland's Call" and "Amhrán na bhFiann" are only played together in Dublin, and that outside the Irish republic only "Ireland's Call" is used.

At the 2011 Rugby World Cup, 2015 Rugby World Cup and 2019 Rugby World Cup the Ireland team entered the field of play at the beginning of their matches with the Irish tricolour and the Flag of Ulster.

Home grounds
The traditional home of Irish rugby is Lansdowne Road in Dublin, where most of Ireland's home matches were held. The stadium was rebuilt between 2007 and 2010. Naming rights were sold to an insurance company, and the venue is now referred to as the Aviva Stadium.

The original stadium, owned by the Irish Rugby Football Union, was built in 1872, and so the venue continues to hold the distinction as the oldest still in use for international rugby. In 1878 the ground hosted its first rugby Test, with Ireland playing host to the English (the first representative rugby match had taken place prior to the Test, a game between Ulster and Leinster). Lansdowne Road had a capacity of just over 49,000 before it was demolished in summer 2007. The redeveloped stadium seats 51,700 and was opened in May 2010. The final Irish Test prior to work commencing on the remodelled stadium was against the Pacific Islanders in late 2006.

With Lansdowne Road unavailable for use, Ireland was without a suitable home ground for the subsequent Six Nations. The Gaelic Athletic Association (GAA) owned Croke Park (an 82,500 capacity stadium), was made available for Ireland's two home games against France and England in 2007. It was the first time ever that rugby had been played at the venue. Croke Park remained in use for Ireland's Six Nations matches and other major Tests until the completion of the redevelopment at Lansdowne Road.

The first Ireland match at the rebuilt stadium was against reigning World Cup champions South Africa on 6 November 2010. South Africa won the match 23–21. Because of the historic significance of this match, South Africa announced that they would wear their change strip to allow Ireland to wear their home green; normally, the home team change their colours in the event of a clash.

Although Ireland has never totally hosted the Rugby World Cup, select games from both the 1991 and 1999 World Cups were played throughout venues in Ireland. Pool B in 1991 was mainly played in Ireland and Scotland, with two games at Lansdowne Road (involving Ireland) and one (Zimbabwe v Japan) played at Ravenhill, Belfast. A quarter-final and a semi-final were also hosted by Dublin. A similar system was used in 1999, though in addition to Lansdowne and Ravenhill, Thomond Park was also a venue. Lansdowne Road was also the host of a quarter-final in 1999. Ireland were set to host matches at Lansdowne Road for the 2007 World Cup, but due to scheduling conflicts with the reconstruction of the stadium, they decided they were not in a position to host any.

Records

Overall

Below is a table of test matches played by Ireland up to 18 March 2023.

Home Nations – Five Nations – Six Nations championships

Up to date as of 18 March 2023.

The Six Nations Championship, held every year in February and March, is Ireland's only annual tournament. It is contested against England, France, Italy, Scotland and Wales. Ireland was a member of the inaugural Home Nations in 1883, with France and Italy joining later to form the Five and Six Nations respectively. Ireland won their first championship in 1894, also winning the Triple Crown. Ireland's first Grand Slam occurred in the 1948 season and their second in the 2009 season. Following their title in the 2018 Six Nations Championship, Ireland have been outright champions on fourteen occasions and have eight shared wins. Ireland won their third ever Grand Slam in the 2018 Six Nations Championship with a 24–15 win over England at Twickenham on St Patrick's Day. Ireland won their fourth Grand slam and first in Dublin following their 29–16 victory over England in the 2023 Six Nations.

Rugby World Cup

Ireland have competed at every Rugby World Cup tournament. The furthest they have progressed is the quarter-finals, which they have made seven times out of nine. They have finished top of their pool twice, in 2011, after beating pool favourite Australia, and in 2015 leaving France in 2nd place.

In the first tournament, held in Australia and New Zealand in 1987, Ireland finished second in their pool after a loss to Wales, before Ireland were knocked out by Australia in the quarter-final in Sydney.

In 1991 Ireland again lost one match in pool play, this time to Scotland. Ireland again met Australia in the quarter-finals, losing by one point.

In 1995 Ireland were runner-up in their pool to the New Zealand national rugby union team. Ireland were defeated by France in their quarter-final in Durban.

In 1999 Ireland finished second in their pool behind Australia, and went into the quarter-final play-offs (a system exclusive to the 1999 tournament). There they lost to Argentina, and thus, not being a quarter-finalists, Ireland were not given automatic entry into the 2003 tournament.

In qualifying matches, Ireland defeated Russia and Georgia to advance to the 2003 tournament. Ireland finished second to Australia in their pool, and were knocked out by France in the quarter-finals.

In the 2007 World Cup Ireland played in the so-called "Group of death" with hosts France, Argentina, Namibia and Georgia. Ireland defeated Namibia in their opening game 32–17. Their progress was then put into doubt when they beat Georgia 14–10, not obtaining a bonus point. Ireland lost to France 3–25. Entering their last group match against Argentina, needing four tries to secure a bonus point without allowing Argentina anything, Ireland were defeated 15–30 and crashed out at the pool stage for the first time.

Ireland were in Pool C for the 2011 Rugby World Cup with Australia, Russia, USA and Italy. Their first pool game, against the United States, ended in a 22–10 victory for Ireland. Ireland's second pool game was against Australia. Despite being underdogs, Ireland recorded their first victory over Australia at a World Cup with a 15–6 win. Ireland comfortably beat Russia 62–12 in their third pool game. Ireland secured first place in the pool with a 36–6 win over Italy, the first time that Ireland were group winners in their World Cup history. Ireland lost their quarter-final to Wales 10–22.

Ireland topped Pool D of the 2015 Rugby World Cup with four victories, two with bonus points. They kicked off their campaign with a 50–7 win over Canada. Another bonus point victory followed in front of a world record Rugby World Cup crowd of 89,267 at Wembley Stadium, when Ireland saw off Romania 44–10. Ireland then faced Italy, coming out on top 16–9, the only try coming from Keith Earls who surpassed Brian O'Driscoll as Ireland's leading Rugby World Cup try scorer with eight. 
The final pool game saw Ireland face France. Ireland came out 24–9 winners. The victory set up a game for Ireland against Pool C runners up Argentina. Ireland battled their opponents, but a series of mistakes spelt the end for Ireland's RWC of 2015.

Ireland qualified automatically for the 2019 Rugby World Cup in Japan. They played in pool A along with the hosts, Japan, Scotland, Russia and Samoa. They finished the pool with three wins and one loss to finish second behind Japan. They played New Zealand in the quarter-finals where they lost 46–14.

Players

Current squad
On 19th January 2023, Ireland coach Andy Farrell named a 37-player Ireland squad for the 2023 Six Nations Championship.

On 30 January, Tom Stewart was called up as injury cover at hooker, with Rónan Kelleher an injury concern ahead of the tournament.

On 6 February, Michael Milne and Caolin Blade were called up as injury cover, and Roman Salanoa was retained after being called up for injury cover.

On 20 February, Scott Penny , Kieran Treadwell and Joey Carbery were called up as injury cover.

On 3 March, Nick Timoney and Ciaran Frawley were called up.

Head coach:  Andy Farrell

 Caps updated: 19 March 2023

Hall of Fame

Twelve former Ireland players have been inducted into the World Rugby Hall of Fame. The Hall was created in 2006 as the IRB Hall of Fame when the sport's governing body of World Rugby was known as the International Rugby Board. The separate International Rugby Hall of Fame, which had inducted five Ireland players, was merged into the IRB Hall in 2014, shortly before the IRB adopted its current name of World Rugby. All International Hall members who had not been separately inducted to the IRB Hall automatically became members of the renamed World Rugby Hall.

The table below indicates Irish players inducted into the World Rugby Hall of Fame and the year they were inducted in brackets.

Ronnie Dawson (2013) 
Mike Gibson (2010)
Tom Kiernan (2015)
Jack Kyle (2008) 
Basil Maclear (2015)
Willie John McBride (2009)
Syd Millar (2009)
Brian O'Driscoll (2016)
Ronan O'Gara (2018)
Tony O'Reilly (2009)
Fergus Slattery (2015)
Keith Wood (2014)

Individual records

Eight players have represented Ireland in 100 tests or more: Brian O'Driscoll with 133 caps, Ronan O'Gara with 128, Rory Best with 124, Cian Healy with 123, Johnny Sexton with 113, Paul O'Connell with 108, John Hayes with 105 and Conor Murray with 105 caps. Including Lions caps, O'Driscoll has 141 caps (fourth highest in rugby), O'Gara has 130, Sexton has 119, O'Connell has 115, Murray has 113 and Hayes has 107.

O'Gara also holds the Ireland record for test points with 1,083, placing him fifth all-time in international rugby. He is second highest points scorer in Six Nations history, behind his teammate Johnny Sexton who holds the record at 566. O'Driscoll has scored 46 tries for Ireland – an Irish record.

British & Irish Lions
The following Ireland players have represented the British & Irish Lions.

 Thomas Crean: 1896
 Robert Johnston: 1896
 Ian Davidson: 1903
 Alexander Roulston Foster: 1910
 Robert Alexander: 1938
 Samuel Walker: 1938
 Paddy Mayne: 1938
 George J. Morgan: 1938
 Jack Kyle: 1950
 Jim McCarthy: 1950
 Tom Clifford: 1950
 Mick Lane: 1950
 Jimmy Nelson: 1950
 Karl Mullen: 1950
 Robin Roe: 1955
 Cecil Pedlow: 1955
 Robin Thompson: 1955
 Tony O'Reilly: 1955, 1959
 Niall Brophy: 1959, 1962
 Ronnie Dawson: 1959, 1968
 Dave Hewitt: 1959, 1962
 Bill Mulcahy: 1959, 1962
 Andy Mulligan: 1959
 Gordon Wood: 1959
 Noel Murphy: 1959, 1966
 Raymond Hunter: 1962
 Willie John McBride: 1962, 1966, 1968, 1971, 1974
 Tom Kiernan: 1962, 1968
 Syd Millar: 1962, 1968
 Ray McLoughlin: 1966
 Barry Bresnihan: 1966, 1968
 Mike Gibson: 1966, 1968, 1971, 1974, 1977
 Ken Kennedy: 1966, 1974
 Jerry Walsh: 1966
 Roger Young: 1966, 1968
 Mick Doyle: 1968
 Mike Hipwell: 1971
 Sean Lynch: 1971
 Fergus Slattery: 1971, 1974
 Tom Grace:1974
 Ken Goodall:1968
 John Moloney: 1974
 Moss Keane: 1974, 1977
 Willie Duggan: 1977
 Philip Orr: 1977, 1980
 Rodney O'Donnell: 1980
 Colin Patterson: 1980
 John Robbie: 1980
 Colm Tucker: 1980
 Tony Ward: 1980
 Ollie Campbell: 1980, 1983
 John O'Driscoll: 1980, 1983
 Ciaran Fitzgerald: 1983
 David Irwin: 1983
 Mike Kiernan: 1983
 Hugo MacNeill: 1983
 Gerry McLoughlin: 1983
 Trevor Ringland: 1983
 Donal Lenihan: 1983, 1989
 Paul Dean: 1989
 Brendan Mullin: 1989
 Steve Smith: 1989
 Phillip Matthews: 1989
 Vince Cunningham: 1993
 Mick Galwey: 1993
 Richard Wallace: 1993
 Nick Popplewell: 1993
 Eric Miller: 1997
 Paul Wallace: 1997
 Jeremy Davidson: 1997, 2001
 Keith Wood: 1997, 2001
 Rob Henderson: 2001
 Tyrone Howe: 2001
 David Wallace: 2001, 2009
 Malcolm O'Kelly: 2001, 2005
 Brian O'Driscoll: 2001, 2005, 2009, 2013
 Ronan O'Gara: 2001, 2005, 2009
 Shane Byrne: 2005
 Gordon D'Arcy: 2005, 2009
 Simon Easterby: 2005
 John Hayes: 2005, 2009
 Denis Hickie: 2005
 Shane Horgan: 2005
 Geordan Murphy: 2005
 Donncha O'Callaghan: 2005, 2009
 Paul O'Connell: 2005, 2009, 2013
 Stephen Ferris: 2009
 Jamie Heaslip: 2009, 2013
 Keith Earls: 2009
 Tommy Bowe: 2009, 2013
 Luke Fitzgerald: 2009
 Rob Kearney: 2009, 2013
 Cian Healy: 2013
 Tom Court: 2013
 Simon Zebo: 2013
 Conor Murray: 2013, 2017, 2021
 Seán O'Brien: 2013, 2017
 Johnny Sexton: 2013, 2017
 Rory Best: 2013, 2017
 Robbie Henshaw: 2017, 2021
 Peter O'Mahony: 2017
 CJ Stander: 2017
 Iain Henderson: 2017, 2021
 Jack McGrath: 2017
 Tadhg Furlong: 2017, 2021
 Jared Payne: 2017
 Bundee Aki: 2021
 Tadhg Beirne: 2021
 Jack Conan: 2021
 Andrew Porter: 2021
 Ronan Kelleher: 2021

Coaching and management

Current Coaching and Management team

Correct as of 11 February 2022

Coaches (Past to Present)
The IRFU first appointed a coach in 1968. The current head coach is Andy Farrell who has been in the position since 2019.

 Ronnie Dawson: 1969–1972
 Syd Millar: 1973–1975
 Roly Meates: 1975–1977
 Noel Murphy: 1977–1980
 Tom Kiernan: 1980–1983
 Willie John McBride: 1983–1984
 Mick Doyle: 1984–1987
 Jim Davidson: 1987–1990
 Ciaran Fitzgerald: 1990–1992
 Gerry Murphy: 1993–1995
 Murray Kidd: 1995–1997
 Brian Ashton: 1997–1998
 Warren Gatland: 1998–2001
 Eddie O'Sullivan: 2001–2008
 Michael Bradley: 2008 (Interim coach)
 Declan Kidney: 2008–2013
 Les Kiss: 2013 (Interim coach)
 Joe Schmidt: 2013–2019
 Andy Farrell: 2019–

Head coaches and statistics (professional era)
Correct as of 18 March 2023

Media coverage
Ireland's end-of-year tests were broadcast by the BBC until 2013 when Sky Sports secured the rights. From November 2018, the TV rights to the end-of-year matches were held by Channel 4 in the UK and RTÉ in Ireland, while TV3 Ireland and BBC/ITV retained the Six Nations rights, and ITV and TV3 with Eir Sports have the rights to the Rugby World Cup. From 2022, Amazon Prime Video holds the rights for Ireland's end-of-year internationals.

See also
 Ireland Wolfhounds
 Emerging Ireland
 Ireland national under-20 rugby union team
 Ireland national under-18 rugby union team
 Ireland national rugby sevens team
 Millennium Trophy

References

External links

 
 Irish rugby union news from Planet Rugby
 History of Rugby in other countries

 
Rugby union in Ireland
European national rugby union teams